Otto August Rosenberger (10 August 1800 – 23 January 1890) was a Baltic German astronomer from Tukums in Courland.

He was born in Tukkum, Courland, Russia. Rosenberger graduated from the University of Königsberg, and was noted for his study of comets. He won the Gold Medal of the Royal Astronomical Society in 1837. He died in Halle, Prussian Saxony.

The crater Rosenberger on the Moon is named after him.

References

External links
Otto August Rosenberger 

1800 births
1890 deaths
People from Tukums
People from Courland Governorate
Baltic-German people
19th-century German astronomers
Recipients of the Gold Medal of the Royal Astronomical Society
University of Königsberg alumni
Academic staff of the Martin Luther University of Halle-Wittenberg
Foreign Members of the Royal Society